Chris Simons (born 1 March 1965) is a Dutch politician. He serves as a member of the House of Representatives since 22 March 2022. He replaces Ockje Tellegen during her sick leave. He is a member of the People's Party for Freedom and Democracy (VVD).

References 

Living people
1965 births
People from Middelburg, Zeeland
21st-century Dutch politicians
Members of the House of Representatives (Netherlands)
People's Party for Freedom and Democracy politicians